Fernando Tropea (5 May 1905 – 7 July 1985, in Castel San Pietro Romano) was a prolific Italian film editor, who worked on around ninety films during his twenty-year career. During the Fascist era he worked on films such as Naples of Former Days (1938) and Carmen fra i rossi (1939).

Selected filmography

 What Scoundrels Men Are! (1932)
 Your Money or Your Life (1932)
 The Haller Case (1933)
 Unripe Fruit (1934)
 Like the Leaves (1935)
 Those Two (1935)
 The Divine Spark (1935)
 Casta Diva (1935)
 The Man Who Smiles (1936)
 God's Will Be Done (1936)
 The Phantom Gondola (1936)
 But It's Nothing Serious (1936)
 Adam's Tree (1936)
 The Great Appeal (1936)
 The Amnesiac (1936)
 Joe the Red (1936)
 A Woman Between Two Worlds (1936)
 The Love of the Maharaja (1936)
 Abandon All Hope (1937)
 The Two Misanthropists (1937)
 The Last Days of Pompeo (1937)
 Naples of Olden Times (1938)
 They've Kidnapped a Man (1938)
 The Two Mothers (1938)
 A Lady Did It (1938)
 Departure (1938)
 Castles in the Air (1939)
 Naples Will Never Die (1939)
 Defendant, Stand Up! (1939)
 The Siege of the Alcazar (1940)
 Light in the Darkness (1941)
 Bengasi (1942)
 I Live as I Please (1942)
 Invisible Chains (1942)
 Luisa Sanfelice (1942)
 Annabella's Adventure (1943)
 Lively Teresa (1943)
 Maria Malibran (1943)
 Life Begins Anew (1945)
 Departure at Seven (1946)
 Fury (1947)
 The Legend of Faust (1949)
 Beauties on Bicycles (1951)
 Free Escape (1951)

References

Sources 
 Cardullo, Bert. Vittorio De Sica: Director, Actor, Screenwriter. McFarland, 2002. 
 Hortelano,Lorenzo J. Torres. Directory of World Cinema: Spain. Intellect Books, 2011.

External links 
 

1905 births
1985 deaths
People from Bracciano
Italian film editors